Hanson Duvall Puthuff (August 21, 1875 – May 12, 1972) was a landscape painter and muralist, born in Waverly, Missouri. Puthuff studied at the Art Institute of Chicago before moving to Colorado in 1889 to study at University of Denver Art School. He traveled to Los Angeles in 1903 and for 23 years worked as a commercial artist painting billboards while painting landscapes in his leisure. In 1926, he abandoned commercial art and devote full-time to fine art and exhibitions. He is nationally famous for his lyric interpretations of the Southern California deserts. Puthuff died in Corona del Mar on May 12, 1972.

Puthuff was one of the cofounders of the California Art Club and the Laguna Beach Art Association. He won awards in 1909 from the Alaska–Yukon–Pacific Exposition, a bronze medal at the Paris Salon in 1914, and two silver medals from the Panama-California Exposition in 1915. His works are exhibited in, among other places, the Los Angeles County Museum of Art, Laguna Art Museum, and Bowers Museum. Many of his works are also cataloged in the Smithsonian American Art Museum art inventory.

In 2007, the Pasadena Museum of California Art featured California Colors: Hanson Puthuff, the first solo museum exhibition of his work. In conjunction with the exhibit, the Museum republished the artist's autobiography.

References

External links
 Puthuff's Listing In The Smithsonian's SIRIS System

Painters from Missouri
American landscape painters
19th-century American painters
American male painters
20th-century American painters
1875 births
1972 deaths
People from Lafayette County, Missouri
19th-century American male artists
20th-century American male artists